Cream of the Crap! Vol. 2 is the second compilation album from The Hellacopters containing rare singles, B-sides, EP selections, and other non-album tracks by the band. It was released in 2004.

Track listing
 "I Only Got the Shakes" (The Hellacopters) - 1:19
 B-side of the single "Dirty Women"
 "A House Is Not a Motel" (Arthur Lee) - 2:48
 Love cover, released on split single with Powder Monkeys
 "Geekstreak" (Nicke Andersson) - 3:31
 From the EP Geekstreak
 "Another Place" (The Hellacopters) - 4:30
 B-side of the limited edition single "What Are You"
 "Slow Down (Take a Look)" (Scott Morgan) - 3:44
 Sonic's Rendezvous Band cover, performed with Scott Morgan
 "Holiday Cramps" (The Hellacopters) - 3:12
 B-side of the single "The Devil Stole the Beat from the Lord"
 "Lowdown" (The Hellacopters) - 2:00
 B-side of the limited edition single "What Are You"
 "Be Not Content" (The Hellacopters) - 3:11
 B-side of the single "The Devil Stole the Beat from the Lord"
 "16 with a Bullet" (Scott Morgan) - 2:38
 Performed with Scott Morgan
 "Times Are Low" (The Hellacopters) - 2:45
 From the limited edition "Rock & Roll Jihad"
 "Low Down Shakin' Chills" (Vahleberg, Östlund, Carlsson, Johnsson) - 4:19
 B-side of the "(Gotta Get Some Action) Now!"
 "(It's Not a) Long Way Down" (The Hellacopters) - 3:57
 From the vinyl single
 "Time to Fall" (Deniz Tek) - 3:09
 From the various artists album Flattery: A Tribute to Radio Birdman
 "What Are You" (The Hellacopters) - 1:24
 From the single "Whate Are You"
 "Ain't Nothin' to Do" (Stiv Bators, Cheetah Chrome) - 2:40
 B-side of the single "Soulseller", Dead Boys cover
 "Kick This One Slow" (The Hellacopters) - 4:42
 From the 10" Split with Gluecifer: "Respect The Rock"
 "Bullet" (Glenn Danzig) - 1:34
 From the various artists album Hell on Earth: A Tribute to the Misfits
 "A Cross for Cain" - 2:42
 B-side of the single "Toys and Flavors"
 "All American Man" (Stanley, Delaney) - 3:54
 From Frank Wants You to Join the 1996 Punk Rock 'N' Roll Horrorshow
 "Ghoul School" (The Hellacopters) - 2:39
 B-side of the "(Gotta Get Some Action) Now!"
 "Master Race Rock" (Andy Shernoff) - 4:04
 The Dictators cover, from the split single with Powder Monkeys
 "Dirty Women" (Tony Iommi, Geezer Butler, Bill Ward, Ozzy Osbourne) - 2:19
 Black Sabbath cover, from a vinyl single

External links
Official site

2001 compilation albums
The Hellacopters albums